Michael Gordon Friede (born September 22, 1957) is a former American football wide receiver who played two seasons in the National Football League (NFL) with the Detroit Lions and New York Giants. He was drafted by the Lions in the third round of the 1980 NFL Draft. He first enrolled at Garden City Community College before transferring to Indiana University Bloomington. Friede attended Goodland High School in Goodland, Kansas. He was also a member of the New Jersey Generals of the United States Football League.

References

External links
Just Sports Stats

Living people
1957 births
Players of American football from Montana
American football wide receivers
Garden City Broncbusters football players
Indiana Hoosiers football players
Detroit Lions players
New York Giants players
New Jersey Generals players
People from Havre, Montana